

287001–287100 

|-bgcolor=#f2f2f2
| colspan=4 align=center | 
|}

287101–287200 

|-bgcolor=#f2f2f2
| colspan=4 align=center | 
|}

287201–287300 

|-bgcolor=#f2f2f2
| colspan=4 align=center | 
|}

287301–287400 

|-id=347
| 287347 Mézes ||  || Tibor Mézes (born 1942), a Slovak amateur astronomer and popularizer of astronomy || 
|}

287401–287500 

|-bgcolor=#f2f2f2
| colspan=4 align=center | 
|}

287501–287600 

|-bgcolor=#f2f2f2
| colspan=4 align=center | 
|}

287601–287700 

|-id=693
| 287693 Hugonnaivilma ||  || Vilma Hugonnai (1847–1922), the first Hungarian woman medical doctor, receiving her degree in 1879 in Zurich || 
|}

287701–287800 

|-id=787
| 287787 Karády ||  || Katalin Karády (1910–1990), a Hungarian actress awarded the Righteous among the Nations for rescuing Hungarian Jews || 
|}

287801–287900 

|-id=829
| 287829 Juancarlos ||  || Juan Carlos Atienza Ballano (1961–2017) was a Catholic priest for 33 years. He held the positions of Episcopal Vicar, Rector of the Seminary and Dean of the El Burgo de Osma Cathedral, amongst others. He worked to conserve the religious artistic heritage of Soria province. || 
|}

287901–288000 

|-bgcolor=#f2f2f2
| colspan=4 align=center | 
|}

References 

287001-288000